Alan Cornwall may refer to:

Alan Cornwall (priest), Archdeacon of Cheltenham, father of the cricketer
Alan Cornwall (cricketer) (1898–1984), English cricketer, son of the clergyman